"Tap Turns on the Water" is a song and single by British band, C.C.S. Written by band leader Alexis Korner and John Cameron, it was first released in the UK in 1971.

Background and chart success
The song was the third chart success by C.C.S. and their most successful. It reached number five in the UK Singles Chart in September 1971 and remained in the chart for 15 weeks.

The song was choreographed for BBC dance troupe Pan's People at Kempton Park pumping station.

The lyrics for the song were also adapted to be used as a football song by the supporters of Bristol Rovers.

References 

1971 songs
1971 singles
Football songs and chants
Song recordings produced by Mickie Most
RAK Records singles
Songs written by Alexis Korner
Songs written by John Cameron (musician)